Sebastian Bader (born 22 January 1988) is an Austrian tennis player playing on the ATP Challenger Tour. On 18 November 2013, he reached his highest ATP doubles ranking of 255.

Tour titles

Doubles

External links
 
 

1988 births
Living people
Austrian male tennis players
20th-century Austrian people
21st-century Austrian people